Nassarius paucicostatus is a species of sea snail, a marine gastropod mollusc in the family Nassariidae, the nassa mud snails or dog whelks.

Description
The shell grows to a length of 12 mm.

Distribution
This species occurs in the Caribbean Sea, the Gulf of Mexico and off the Bahamas.

References

 Cernohorsky W. O. (1984). Systematics of the family Nassariidae (Mollusca: Gastropoda). Bulletin of the Auckland Institute and Museum 14: 1–356
 Rosenberg, G., F. Moretzsohn, and E. F. García. 2009. Gastropoda (Mollusca) of the Gulf of Mexico, Pp. 579–699 in Felder, D.L. and D.K. Camp (eds.), Gulf of Mexico–Origins, Waters, and Biota. Biodiversity. Texas A&M Press, College Station, Texas.

External links
 

Nassariidae
Gastropods described in 1877